DeBrusk is a surname. Notable people with the surname include:

Jake DeBrusk (born 1996), Canadian ice hockey player
Louie DeBrusk (born 1971), Canadian ice hockey player and commentator, father of Jake